Wargo is a surname. Notable people with the surname include:

Christian Wargo (born 1976), American singer
John Wargo, American politician
Joseph G. Wargo (1922–1999), American politician
Tom Wargo (born 1942), American golfer